Veierød is a Norwegian surname. Notable people with the surname include:

Tom Veierød (born 1937), Norwegian civil servant
Tove Veierød (born 1940), Norwegian politician

Norwegian-language surnames